Elco is an unincorporated community in Alexander County, Illinois, United States. Elco is located along Illinois Route 127 north of Tamms. Elco once had a post office, which closed on January 24, 1998.

Education
It is in the Egyptian School District.

References

Unincorporated communities in Alexander County, Illinois
Unincorporated communities in Illinois
Cape Girardeau–Jackson metropolitan area